Lamason may refer to any of the following:

People

Ina Lamason (1911-1994), New Zealand women's cricketer
Jack Lamason (1905-1961), New Zealand cricketer
Joy Lamason (1915–2012), New Zealand cricketer
Phil Lamason (1918-2012), New Zealand pilot during World War II

Places

Lamasón, municipality located in the autonomous community of Cantabria, Spain

See also

Charles N. Lamison
Otis Lamson